En Nahud Airport  is an airstrip serving the town of En Nahud in Sudan. The runway has housing encroaching its boundaries, and is subject to vehicle traffic.

See also

Transport in Sudan
List of airports in Sudan

References

 Google Earth

External links
 OurAirports - Sudan
 En Nahud

Airports in Sudan